Igor Vladimirovich Sysoyev (Russian: Игорь Владимирович Сысоев, also transliterated as Sysoev; born 5 September 1980, in Leningrad), is a Russian professional triathlete. Since 2003 he has been married to the Russian triathlete and long distance swimmer Irina Abysova.

Sysoyev is the winner of the Russian Cup of the year 2009 and according to the official Russian rating of the year 2009, which takes into account various Russian and international competitions, he was the number 10 among the best Russian triathletes. At the Russian Championships 2010 in Penza Sysoyev placed 5th.

In 2010 Sysoyev takes part in the Club Championship Series Lyonnaise des Eaux, representing the club Metz Tri. At the opening triathlon of this French circuit in Dunkirk (23 May 2010) he placed 20th. At the Triathlon de Paris (18 July 2010) he placed 80th, at the Grand Final in La Baule (Triathlon Audencia, 18 September 2010), however, he was again the best of his club placing 18th.

ITU Competitions 
In the ten years from 2001 to 2009 Sysoyev took part in 67 ITU competitions and achieved 24 top ten positions.
At the Olympic Games in Athens he placed 15th, and at the Olympic Games in Beijing he placed 9th.
The following list is based upon the official ITU rankings and the ITU Athlete's Profile Page. Unless indicated otherwise the following events are triathlons and belong to the Elite category.

BG = the sponsor British Gas · DNF = did not finish · DNS = did not start

External links 
 Russian Triathlon Federation in Russian

Notes 

1980 births
Living people
Olympic triathletes of Russia
Sportspeople from Saint Petersburg
Triathletes at the 2008 Summer Olympics
Russian male triathletes